William Crooke Ronayne Harman (29 May 1869 in County Cork, Ireland – 4 July 1962 in County Cork) was an Irish cricketer. He played just once for the Ireland cricket team, a first-class match against Yorkshire in May 1907. His brother George played first-class cricket for Dublin University, but was much more notable as an international rugby player for

References

External links
CricketEurope Stats Zone profile
Cricket Archive profile
Cricinfo profile

1869 births
1962 deaths
Irish cricketers
Cricketers from County Cork